The Men's time trial B road cycling event at the 2012 Summer Paralympics took place on September 5 at Brands Hatch. Seventeen riders from fifteen different nations competed. The race distance was 24 km.

Results

References

Men's road time trial B